Yellow sage is a common name for several plants and may refer to:

Lantana camara, native to the American tropics
Salvia koyamae, native to Japan